Nebot is a surname. Notable people with the surname include:

 Asensio Nebot (1779–?), Spanish monk and rebel
 Balthazar Nebot, eighteenth-century English painter
 Jaime Nebot (born 1946), Ecuadorian lawyer and politician